Éamon de Valera (first registered as George de Valero; changed some time before 1901 to Edward de Valera; 14 October 1882 – 29 August 1975) was a prominent Irish statesman and political leader. He served several terms as head of government and head of state and had a leading role in introducing the 1937 Constitution of Ireland.

Prior to de Valera's political career, he was a commandant of Irish Volunteers at Boland's Mill during the 1916 Easter Rising. He was arrested and sentenced to death but released for a variety of reasons, including his American citizenship and the public response to the British execution of Rising leaders. He returned to Ireland after being jailed in England and became one of the leading political figures of the War of Independence. After the signing of the Anglo-Irish Treaty, de Valera served as the political leader of Anti-Treaty Sinn Féin until 1926, when he, along with many supporters, left the party to set up Fianna Fáil, a new political party which abandoned the policy of abstentionism from Dáil Éireann.

From there, de Valera went on to be at the forefront of Irish politics until the turn of the 1960s. He took over as president of the Executive Council from W. T. Cosgrave and later became Taoiseach, with the adoption of the Constitution of Ireland in 1937. He served as Taoiseach on three different occasions: from 1937 to 1948, from 1951 to 1954, and finally from 1957 to 1959. He remains the longest serving Taoiseach by total days served in the post. He resigned in 1959 upon his election as president of Ireland. By then, he had been Leader of Fianna Fáil for 33 years and he, along with older founding members, began to take a less prominent role relative to newer ministers such as Jack Lynch, Charles Haughey and Neil Blaney. De Valera served as President of Ireland from 1959 to 1973, two full terms in office.

De Valera's political beliefs evolved from militant Irish republicanism to strong social, cultural and fiscal conservatism. He has been characterised as having a stern and unbending, and also devious demeanour. His roles in the Civil War have also been interpreted as making him a divisive figure in Irish history. Biographer Tim Pat Coogan sees his time in power as being characterised by economic and cultural stagnation, while Diarmaid Ferriter argues that the stereotype of de Valera as an austere, cold, and even backward figure was largely manufactured in the 1960s and is misguided.

Early life
Éamon de Valera was born on 14 October 1882 in New York City, the son of Catherine Coll, who was originally from Bruree, County Limerick, and Juan Vivion de Valera, described on the birth certificate as a Spanish artist born in 1853. Some researchers have placed his father's place of birth in Cuba, while others have suggested other locations; according to Antonio Rivero Taravillo, he was born in Seville, while Ronan Fanning has him born in the Basque Country.

He was born at the Nursery and Child's Hospital, Lexington Avenue, a home for destitute orphans and abandoned children. His parents were reportedly married on 18 September 1881 at St Patrick's Church in Jersey City, New Jersey, but archivists have not located any marriage certificate or any birth, baptismal, or death certificate information for anyone called Juan Vivion de Valera (nor for "de Valeros", an alternative spelling). On de Valera's original birth certificate, his name is given as George de Valero and his father is listed as Vivion de Valero. Although he was known as Edward de Valera before 1901, a fresh birth certificate was issued in 1910, in which his first name was officially changed to Edward and his father's surname given as "de Valera". As a child, he was known as "Eddie" or "Eddy".

According to Coll, Juan Vivion died in 1885 leaving Coll and her child in poor circumstances. Éamon was taken to Ireland by his uncle Ned at the age of two. When his mother remarried in the mid-1880s, he was not brought back to live with her, but was reared by his grandmother, Elizabeth Coll, her son Patrick and her daughter Hannie, in Bruree, County Limerick. He was educated locally at Bruree National School, County Limerick and C.B.S. Charleville, County Cork. Aged sixteen, he won a scholarship. He was not successful in enrolling at two colleges in Limerick, but was accepted at Blackrock College, Dublin, at the instigation of his local curate.

He played rugby at Blackrock and Rockwell College, then for Munster around 1905. He remained a lifelong devotee of rugby, attending international matches even towards the end of his life when he was nearly blind.

At the end of his first year at Blackrock College he was student of the year. He also won further scholarships and exhibitions and in 1903 was appointed teacher of mathematics at Rockwell College, County Tipperary. It was here that de Valera was first given the nickname "Dev" by a teaching colleague, Tom O'Donnell. In 1904, he graduated in mathematics from the Royal University of Ireland. He then studied for a year at Trinity College Dublin but, owing to the necessity of earning a living, did not proceed further and returned to teaching, this time at Belvedere College. In 1906, he secured a post as a teacher of mathematics at Carysfort Teachers' Training College for women in Blackrock, Dublin. His applications for professorships in colleges of the National University of Ireland were unsuccessful, but he obtained a part-time appointment at St Patrick's College, Maynooth and also taught mathematics at various Dublin schools, including Castleknock College (1910–1911; under the name Edward de Valera) and Belvedere College.

There were occasions when de Valera seriously contemplated the religious life like his half-brother, Fr. Thomas Wheelwright, but ultimately he did not pursue this vocation. As late as 1906, when he was 24 years old, he approached the President of Clonliffe Seminary in Dublin for advice on his vocation. De Valera was throughout his life portrayed as a deeply religious man, and in death asked to be buried in a religious habit. His biographer, Tim Pat Coogan, speculated that questions surrounding de Valera's legitimacy may have been a deciding factor in his not entering religious life. Being illegitimate would have been a bar to receiving priestly orders, but not to becoming a lay member of a religious order.

As a young  (Irish speaker), de Valera became an activist for the Irish language. In 1908, he joined the Árdchraobh of Conradh na Gaeilge (the Gaelic League), where he met Sinéad Flanagan, a teacher by profession and four years his senior. They were married on 8 January 1910 at St Paul's Church, Arran Quay, Dublin.

The couple had five sons: Vivion (1910–1982), Éamon (1913–1986), Brian (1915–1936), Rúaidhrí (1916–1978), and Terence (Terry; 1922–2007); and two daughters: Máirín (1912–1984) and Emer (1918–2012). Brian de Valera predeceased his parents.

Early political activity

While he was already involved in the Gaelic revival, de Valera's involvement in the political revolution began on 25 November 1913, when he joined the Irish Volunteers. The organisation was formed to oppose the Ulster Volunteers and ensure the enactment of the Irish Parliamentary Party's Third Home Rule Act won by its leader John Redmond. After the outbreak of World War I in August 1914, de Valera rose through the ranks and it was not long before he was elected captain of the Donnybrook branch. Preparations were pushed ahead for an armed revolt, and he was made commandant of the Third Battalion and adjutant of the Dublin Brigade. He took part in the Howth gun-running. He was sworn by Thomas MacDonagh into the oath-bound Irish Republican Brotherhood, which secretly controlled the central executive of the Volunteers. He opposed secret societies, but this was the only way he could be guaranteed full information on plans for the Rising.

Revolutionary years

1916 Easter Rising

On 24 April 1916, the Easter Rising began. Forces commanded by de Valera occupied Boland's Mill on Grand Canal Street in Dublin. His chief task was to cover the southeastern approaches to the city. After a week of fighting, the order came from Pádraig Pearse to surrender. De Valera was court-martialled, convicted, and sentenced to death, but the sentence was immediately commuted to penal servitude for life.

De Valera was among the few republican leaders the British did not execute. It has been argued that his life was saved by four facts. First, he was one of the last to surrender and he was held in a different prison from other leaders, thus his execution was delayed by practicalities. Second, the US Consulate in Dublin made representations before his trial (i.e., was he actually a United States citizen and if so, how would the United States react to the execution of one of its citizens?) while the full legal situation was clarified. The UK was trying to bring the US into the war in Europe at the time, and the Irish American vote was important in US politics. Third, when Lt-Gen Sir John Maxwell reviewed his case he said, "Who is he? I haven't heard of him before. I wonder would he be likely to make trouble in the future?" On being told that de Valera was unimportant, he commuted the court-martial's death sentence to life imprisonment. De Valera had no Fenian family or personal background and his MI5 file in 1916 was very slim, detailing only his open membership in the Irish Volunteers. Fourth, by the time de Valera was court-martialled on 8 May, political pressure was being brought to bear on Maxwell to halt the executions; Maxwell had already told British Prime Minister H. H. Asquith that only two more were to be executed, Seán Mac Diarmada and James Connolly, although they were court-martialled the day after de Valera. His late trial, representations made by the American Consulate, his lack of Fenian background and political pressure all combined to save his life, though had he been tried a week earlier he would probably have been shot.

De Valera's supporters and detractors argue about his bravery during the Easter Rising. His supporters claim he showed leadership skills and a capacity for meticulous planning. His detractors claim he suffered a nervous breakdown during the Rising. According to accounts from 1916, de Valera was seen running about, giving conflicting orders, refusing to sleep and on one occasion, having forgotten the password, almost getting himself shot in the dark by his own men. According to one account, de Valera, on being forced to sleep by one subordinate who promised to sit beside him and wake him if he was needed, suddenly woke up, his eyes "wild", screaming, "Set fire to the railway! Set fire to the railway!" Later in the Ballykinlar internment Camp, one de Valera loyalist approached another internee, a medical doctor, recounted the story, and asked for a medical opinion as to de Valera's condition. He also threatened to sue the doctor, future Fine Gael TD and Minister, Dr. Tom O'Higgins, if he ever repeated the story. The British reportedly, however, considered de Valera's forces the best-trained and best-led among the rebels. De Valera's latest biographer, Anthony J. Jordan, writes of this controversy, "Whatever happened in Boland's Mills, or any other garrison, does not negate or undermine in any way the extraordinary heroism of "Dev" and his comrades".

After imprisonment in Dartmoor, Maidstone and Lewes prisons, de Valera and his comrades were released under an amnesty in June 1917. On 10 July 1917, he was elected as the Member of Parliament (MP) for East Clare (the constituency which he represented until 1959) in a by-election caused by the death of the previous incumbent Willie Redmond, brother of the Irish Party leader John Redmond, who had died fighting in World War I. In the 1918 general election he was elected both for that seat and Mayo East. But because most other Irish rebellion leaders were dead, in 1917 he was elected President of Sinn Féin, the party which had been blamed incorrectly for provoking the Easter Rising. This party became the political vehicle through which the survivors of the Easter Rising channelled their republican ethos and objectives. The previous President of Sinn Féin, Arthur Griffith, had championed an Anglo-Irish dual-monarchy based on the Austro-Hungarian model, with independent legislatures for both Ireland and Britain.

President of Dáil Éireann

Sinn Féin won a huge majority in the 1918 general election, largely thanks to the British executions of the 1916 leaders, the threat of conscription with the Conscription Crisis of 1918 and the first-past-the-post ballot. They won 73 out of 105 Irish seats, with about 47% of votes cast. 25 seats were uncontested. On 21 January 1919, 27 Sinn Féin MPs (the rest were imprisoned or impaired), calling themselves Teachtaí Dála (TDs), assembled in the Mansion House in Dublin and formed an Irish parliament, known as Dáil Éireann (translatable into English as the Assembly of Ireland). The Ministry of Dáil Éireann was formed, under the leadership of the Príomh Aire (also called President of Dáil Éireann) Cathal Brugha. De Valera had been re-arrested in May 1918 and imprisoned and so could not attend the January session of the Dáil. He escaped from Lincoln Gaol, England in February 1919. As a result, he replaced Brugha as Príomh Aire in the April session of Dáil Éireann.

In the hope of securing international recognition, Seán T. O'Kelly was sent as envoy to Paris to present the Irish case to the Peace Conference convened by the great powers at the end of World War I. When it became clear by May 1919 that this mission could not succeed, de Valera decided to visit the United States. The mission had three objectives: to ask for official recognition of the Irish Republic, to float a loan to finance the work of the Government (and by extension, the Irish Republican Army), and to secure the support of the American people for the republic. His visit lasted from June 1919 to December 1920 and had mixed success, including a visit to Fenway Park in Boston in front of 50,000 supporters. One negative outcome was the splitting of the Irish-American organisations into pro- and anti-de Valera factions. He met the young Harvard-educated leader from Puerto Rico, Pedro Albizu Campos, and forged a lasting and useful alliance with him. It was during this American tour that he recruited his long-serving personal secretary, Kathleen O'Connell, an Irish emigrant who would return to Ireland with him. In October 1919, he visited the University of Notre Dame campus in Indiana, where he planted a tree and also laid a wreath by the statue of William Corby. He toured the university archives and spoke in Washington Hall about the cause of Ireland in front of twelve hundred students.

De Valera managed to raise $5,500,000 from American supporters, an amount that far exceeded the hopes of the Dáil. Of this, $500,000 was devoted to the American presidential campaign in 1920, helping him gain wider public support there. In 1921, it was said that $1,466,000 had already been spent, and it is unclear when the net balance arrived in Ireland. Recognition was not forthcoming in the international sphere. He also had difficulties with various Irish-American leaders, such as John Devoy and Judge Daniel F. Cohalan, who resented the dominant position he established, preferring to retain their control over Irish affairs in the United States.

While American recognition for the Republic had been his priority, in February 1921, De Valera redirected Patrick McCartan from Washington to Moscow. McCartan was told by Maxim Litvinov, that the opportunity of recognition and assistance had passed. The Soviet priority was a trade agreement with Britain (signed in March). In June the British government (with a view to both domestic and American opinion) published the proposed treaty between the Dáil government and the Soviets, and related correspondence.

Meanwhile, in Ireland, the conflict between the British authorities and the Dáil (which the British declared illegal in September 1919), escalated into the Irish War of Independence. De Valera left day-to-day government, during his eighteen-month absence in the United States, to Michael Collins, his 29-year-old Minister for Finance. De Valera and Collins would later become opponents during the Irish Civil War.

President of the Republic

In January 1921, in his first appearance in the Dáil, after his return to a country gripped by the War of Independence, de Valera introduced a motion calling on the IRA to desist from ambushes and other tactics that were allowing the British to successfully portray it as a terrorist group, and to take on the British forces with conventional military methods. This they strongly opposed, and de Valera relented, issuing a statement expressing support for the IRA, and claimed it was fully under the control of the Dáil. He then, along with Cathal Brugha and Austin Stack, brought pressure to bear on Michael Collins to undertake a journey to the United States himself, on the pretext that only he could take up where de Valera had left off. Collins successfully resisted this move and stayed in Ireland. In the elections of May 1921, all candidates in Southern Ireland were returned unopposed, and Sinn Féin secured some seats in Northern Ireland. Following the Truce of July 1921 that ended the war, de Valera went to see Prime Minister David Lloyd George in London on 14 July. No agreement was reached, and by then the Parliament of Northern Ireland had already met. It became clear that neither a republic, nor independence for all 32 counties, was going to be offered; Lloyd George told de Valera he could "put a soldier in Ireland for every man, woman and child in it" if the IRA did not immediately agree to stop fighting. In August 1921, de Valera secured Dáil Éireann approval to change the 1919 Dáil Constitution to upgrade his office from prime minister or chairman of the cabinet to a full President of the Republic. Declaring himself now the Irish equivalent of King George V, he argued that as Irish head of state, in the absence of the British head of state from the negotiations, he too should not attend the peace conference called the Treaty Negotiations (October–December 1921) at which British and Irish government leaders agreed to the effective independence of twenty-six of Ireland's thirty-two counties as the Irish Free State, with Northern Ireland choosing to remain under British sovereignty. It is generally agreed by historians that whatever his motives, it was a mistake for de Valera not to have travelled to London.

Having effected these changes, a boundary commission came into place to redraw the Irish border. Nationalists expected its report to recommend that largely nationalist areas become part of the Free State, and many hoped this would make Northern Ireland so small it would not be economically viable. A Council of Ireland was also provided in the Treaty as a model for an eventual all-Irish parliament. Hence neither the pro- nor anti-Treaty sides made many complaints about partition in the Treaty Debates.

Anglo-Irish Treaty
The Republic's delegates to the Treaty Negotiations were accredited by de Valera and his cabinet as plenipotentiaries (that is, negotiators with the legal authority to sign a treaty without reference back to the cabinet), but were given secret cabinet instructions by de Valera that required them to return to Dublin before signing the Treaty. The Treaty proved controversial in Ireland insofar as it replaced the Republic by a dominion of the British Commonwealth with the King represented by a Governor-General of the Irish Free State. The Irish delegates Arthur Griffith, Robert Barton and Michael Collins supported by Erskine Childers as Secretary-General set up their delegation headquarters at 22 Hans Place in Knightsbridge. It was there, at 11.15 am on 5 December 1921, that the decision was made to recommend the Treaty to Dáil Éireann. The Treaty was finally signed by the delegates after further negotiations which closed at 02:20 on 6 December 1921.

De Valera baulked at the agreement. His opponents claimed that he had refused to join the negotiations because he knew what the outcome would be and did not wish to receive the blame. De Valera claimed that he had not gone to the treaty negotiations because he would be better able to control the extremists at home, and that his absence would allow leverage for the plenipotentiaries to refer back to him and not be pressured into any agreements. Because of the secret instructions given to the plenipotentiaries, he reacted to news of the signing of the Treaty not with anger at its contents (which he refused even to read when offered a newspaper report of its contents), but with anger over the fact that they had not consulted him, their president, before signing. His ideal drafts, presented to a secret session of the Dáil during the Treaty Debates and publicised in January 1922, were ingenious compromises but they included dominion status, the Treaty Ports, the fact of partition subject to veto by the parliament in Belfast, and some continuing status for the King as head of the Commonwealth. Ireland's share of the imperial debt was to be paid.

After the Treaty was narrowly ratified by 64 to 57, de Valera and a large minority of Sinn Féin TDs left Dáil Éireann. He then resigned and Arthur Griffith was elected President of Dáil Éireann in his place, though respectfully still calling him 'The President'. On a speaking tour of the more republican province of Munster, starting on 17 March 1922, de Valera made controversial speeches at Carrick on Suir, Lismore, Dungarvan and Waterford, saying that: "If the Treaty were accepted, [by the electorate] the fight for freedom would still go on, and the Irish people, instead of fighting foreign soldiers, will have to fight the Irish soldiers of an Irish government set up by Irishmen." At Thurles, several days later, he repeated this imagery and added that the IRA: "..would have to wade through the blood of the soldiers of the Irish Government, and perhaps through that of some members of the Irish Government to get their freedom." In a letter to the Irish Independent on 23 March de Valera accepted the accuracy of their report of his comment about "wading" through blood, but deplored that the newspaper had published it.

De Valera objected to the oath of allegiance to the King that the treaty required Irish parliamentarians to take. He also was concerned that Ireland could not have an independent foreign policy as part of the British Commonwealth when the British retained several naval ports (see Treaty Ports) around Ireland's coast. As a compromise, de Valera proposed "external association" with the British Empire, which would leave Ireland's foreign policy in her own hands and a republican constitution with no mention of the British monarch (he proposed this as early as April, well before the negotiations began, under the title "Document No. 2"). Michael Collins was prepared to accept this formula and the two wings (pro- and anti-Treaty) of Sinn Féin formed a pact to fight the 1922 Irish general election together and form a coalition government afterwards. Collins later called off the pact on the eve of the election. De Valera's opponents won the election and civil war broke out shortly afterwards in late June 1922.

Civil War

Relations between the new Irish government, which was backed by most of the Dáil and the electorate, and the anti-treatyites, under the nominal leadership of de Valera, now descended into the Irish Civil War (June 1922 to May 1923), in which the pro-treaty Free State forces defeated the anti-treaty IRA. Both sides had wanted to avoid civil war, but fighting broke out over the takeover of the Four Courts in Dublin by anti-treaty members of the IRA. These men were not loyal to de Valera and initially were not even supported by the executive of the anti-treaty IRA. However, Michael Collins was forced to act against them when Winston Churchill threatened to re-occupy the country with British troops unless action was taken. When fighting broke out in Dublin between the Four Courts garrison and the new Free State Army, republicans backed the IRA men in the Four Courts, and civil war broke out. De Valera, though he held no military position, backed the anti-treaty IRA, or irregulars, and said that he was re-enlisting in the IRA as an ordinary volunteer. On 8 September 1922, he met in secret with Richard Mulcahy in Dublin to try to halt the fighting. However, according to de Valera, they "could not find a basis" for agreement.

Though nominally head of the anti-treatyites, de Valera had little influence. He does not seem to have been involved in any fighting and had little or no influence with the revolutionary military leadership, headed by IRA Chief of Staff Liam Lynch. De Valera and the anti-treaty TDs formed a "republican government" on 25 October 1922 from anti-treaty TDs to "be temporarily the Supreme Executive of the Republic and the State, until such time as the elected Parliament of the Republic can freely assemble, or the people being rid of external aggression are at liberty to decide freely how they are to be governed". However, it had no real authority and was a pale shadow of the Dáil government of 1919–21.

In March 1923, de Valera attended the meeting of the IRA Army Executive to decide on the future of the war. He was known to be in favour of a truce but he had no voting rights and it was narrowly decided to continue hostilities. The leader of the Free State, W. T. Cosgrave, insisted that there could be no acceptance of a surrender without disarming.

On 30 April 1923, the IRA's new Chief of Staff, Frank Aiken (Lynch had been killed), called a ceasefire. This was followed on 24 May by an order for volunteers to "dump arms". De Valera, who had wanted an end to the internecine fighting for some time, backed the ceasefire order with a message in which he called the anti-treaty fighters "the Legion of the Rearguard", saying that "The Republic can no longer be successfully defended by your arms. Further sacrifice on your part would now be in vain and the continuance of the struggle in arms unwise in the national interest and prejudicial to the future of our cause. Military victory must be allowed to rest for the moment with those who have destroyed the republic. Other means must be sought to safeguard the nation's right."

After this point many of the republicans were arrested in Free State round-ups when they had come out of hiding and returned home. De Valera remained in hiding for several months after the ceasefire was declared; however, he emerged in August to stand for election in County Clare. Making a campaign appearance in Ennis on 15 August, de Valera was arrested on the platform and interned at Kilmainham jail. He was moved to Arbour Hill barracks briefly prior to his release on 16 July 1924.

Founding of Fianna Fáil
After the IRA dumped their arms rather than surrender them or continue a now fruitless war, de Valera returned to political methods. In 1924, he was arrested in Newry for "illegally entering Northern Ireland" and held in solitary confinement for a month in Crumlin Road Gaol, Belfast.

During this time, de Valera came to believe that abstentionism was not a workable tactic in the long term. He now believed that a better course would be to try to gain power and turn the Free State from a constitutional monarchy into a republic. He tried to convince Sinn Féin to accept this new line. However, a vote to accept the Free State Constitution (contingent on the abolition of the Oath of Allegiance) narrowly failed. Soon afterwards, de Valera resigned from Sinn Féin and seriously considered leaving politics.

However, one of his colleagues, Seán Lemass, convinced de Valera to found a new republican party. In March 1926, with Lemass, Constance Markievicz and others, de Valera formed a new party, Fianna Fáil (The Warriors of Destiny), a party that was to dominate 20th-century Irish politics. While Sinn Féin still held to an abstentionist line, Fianna Fáil was dedicated to republicanising the Free State from within if it gained power.

Having attracted most of Sinn Féin's branches due to Lemass' organisational skill, the new party made swift electoral gains in the general election on 9 June 1927. In the process, it took much of Sinn Féin's previous support, winning 44 seats to Sinn Féin's five. It refused to take the Oath of Allegiance (portrayed by opponents as an 'Oath of Allegiance to the Crown' but actually an Oath of Allegiance to the Irish Free State with a secondary promise of fidelity to the King in his role in the Treaty settlement).

The oath was largely the work of Collins and based on three sources: British oaths in the dominions, the oath of the Irish Republican Brotherhood and a draft oath prepared by de Valera in his proposed treaty alternative, "Document No. 2"). De Valera began a legal case to challenge the requirement that members of his party take the Oath, but the assassination of the Vice-President of the Executive Council (deputy prime minister) Kevin O'Higgins on 10 July 1927 led the Executive Council under W. T. Cosgrave to introduce a Bill on 20 July requiring all Dáil candidates to promise on oath that if they were elected they would take the Oath of Allegiance. Forced into a corner, and faced with the option of staying outside politics forever or taking the oath and entering, de Valera and his TDs took the Oath of Allegiance on 12 August 1927, though de Valera himself described the Oath as "an empty political formula".

De Valera never organised Fianna Fáil in Northern Ireland and it was not until 7 December 2007 that Fianna Fáil was registered there by the UK Electoral Commission.

President of the Executive Council

In the 1932 general election Fianna Fáil secured 72 seats and became the largest party in the Dáil, although without a majority. Some Fianna Fáil members arrived at the first sitting of the new Dáil carrying arms, amid fears that Cumann na nGaedheal would not voluntarily surrender power. However, the transition was peaceful. De Valera was elected President of the Executive Council (Prime Minister) by the Dáil by a vote of 81–68, with the support of the Labour Party and Independent politicians, and took office on 9 March.

He at once initiated steps to fulfill his election promises to abolish the oath and withhold land annuities owed to the UK for loans provided under the Irish Land Acts and agreed as part of the 1921 Treaty. This launched the Anglo-Irish Trade War when the UK in retaliation imposed economic sanctions against Irish exports. De Valera responded in kind with levies on British imports. The ensuing "Economic War" lasted until 1938.

After De Valera had urged King George V to dismiss McNeill as Governor-General, the King suggested an alternative course of action: that McNeill, instead, carry on a while longer as viceroy and only then resign, which he did on 1 November 1932. Subsequently, a 1916 veteran, Domhnall Ua Buachalla, was appointed Governor-General. To strengthen his position against the opposition in the Dáil and Seanad, de Valera directed the Governor-General to call a snap election in January 1933 and de Valera's party won 77 seats, giving Fianna Fáil an overall majority. Under de Valera's leadership, Fianna Fáil won further general elections in 1937, 1938, 1943, and 1944.

De Valera took charge of Ireland's foreign policy as well by also acting as Minister for External Affairs. In that capacity, he attended meetings of the League of Nations. He was president of the Council of the League on his first appearance at the league in Geneva, Switzerland, in 1932 and, in a speech that made a worldwide impression, appealed for genuine adherence by its members to the principles of the covenant of the league. In 1934, he supported the admission of the Soviet Union into the league. In September 1938, he was elected nineteenth president of the Assembly of the League, a tribute to the international recognition he had won by his independent stance on world questions.

De Valera's government followed the policy of unilaterally dismantling the treaty of 1921. In this way he would be pursuing republican policies and lessening the popularity of republican violence and the IRA. De Valera encouraged IRA members to join the Irish Defence Forces and the Gardaí. He also refused to dismiss from office those Cumann na nGaedheal, Cosgrave supporters, who had previously opposed him during the Civil War. He did, however, dismiss Eoin O'Duffy from his position as Garda Commissioner after a year. Eoin O'Duffy was then invited to be head of the Army Comrades Association (ACA) formed to protect and promote the welfare of its members, previously led by J.F. O'Higgins, Kevin O'Higgins's brother. This organisation was an obstacle to de Valera's power as it supported Cumann na nGaedheal and provided stewards for their meetings. Cumann na nGaedheal meetings were frequently disrupted by Fianna Fáil supporters following the publication of the article: No Free Speech for Traitors by Peadar O'Donnell, an IRA member.

The ACA changed its name to the National Guard under O'Duffy and adopted the uniform of black berets and blue shirts, using the straight-armed salute, and were nicknamed the Blueshirts. They were outwardly fascist and planned a march in August 1933 through Dublin to commemorate Michael Collins, Kevin O'Higgins, and Arthur Griffith. This march struck parallels with Mussolini's march on Rome (1922), in which he had created the image of having toppled the democratic government in Rome. De Valera revived a military tribunal, which had been set up by the previous administration, to deal with the matter. O'Duffy backed down when the National Guard was declared an illegal organisation and the march was banned. Within a few weeks, O'Duffy's followers merged with Cumann na nGaedhael and the Centre Party to form United Ireland, or Fine Gael, and O'Duffy became its leader. Smaller local marches were scheduled for the following weeks, under different names. Internal dissension set in when the party's TDs distanced themselves from O'Duffy's extreme views, and his movement fell asunder.

Taoiseach (1937–1948)
Fianna Fáil having won the 1937 election held the same day as the plebiscite that ratified the constitution, de Valera continued as President of the Executive Council until 29 December 1937, when the new constitution was enacted. On that date, de Valera's post automatically became that of Taoiseach which was a considerably more powerful office. Notably, he could advise the President to dismiss Ministers individually – advice that the President was bound to follow by convention. The old Executive Council had to be dissolved and reformed  if its President wanted to remove a Minister. Additionally, he could request a parliamentary dissolution on his own authority. Previously, the right to seek a dissolution was vested with the Council as a whole.

In social policy, de Valera's first period as Taoiseach saw the introduction (in 1947) of means-tested allowances for people suffering from infectious diseases.

Anglo-Irish Trade Agreement
With the new constitution in place, de Valera determined that the changed circumstances made swift resolution to Ireland's ongoing trade war with the UK more desirable for both sides — as did the growing probability of the outbreak of war across Europe. In April 1938, de Valera and British Prime Minister Neville Chamberlain signed the Anglo-Irish Trade Agreement, lifting all duties imposed during the previous five years and ending British use of the Treaty Ports it had retained in accordance with the Anglo-Irish Treaty. The return of the ports was of particular significance, since it ensured Irish neutrality during the coming Second World War.

Constitution of Ireland 
During the 1930s, de Valera systematically stripped the Irish Free State constitution – a constitution originally drafted by a committee under the nominal chairmanship of his rival, Collins – of features tying Ireland to the United Kingdom, limiting its independence and the republican character of its state. De Valera was able to carry out this program of constitutional change by taking advantage of three earlier modifications of constitutional arrangements. First, though the 1922 constitution originally required a public plebiscite for any amendment enacted more than eight years after its passage, the Free State government under W. T. Cosgrave had amended that period to sixteen years. This meant that, until 1938, the Free State constitution could be amended by the simple passage of a Constitutional Amendment Act through the Oireachtas. Secondly, while the Governor-General of the Irish Free State could reserve or deny Royal Assent to any legislation, from 1927, the power to advise the Governor-General to do so no longer rested with the British government in London but with His Majesty's Government in the Irish Free State, which meant that, in practice, the Royal Assent was automatically granted to legislation; the government was hardly likely to advise the governor-general to block the enactment of one of its own bills. Thirdly, though in its original theory, the constitution had to be in keeping with the provisions of the Anglo-Irish Treaty as the fundamental law of the state, that requirement had been abrogated a short time before de Valera gained power.

The Oath of Allegiance was abolished, as were appeals to the Judicial Committee of the Privy Council. The opposition-controlled Senate, when it protested and slowed down these measures, was also abolished. In 1931, the British Parliament passed the Statute of Westminster, which established the legislative equal status of the self-governing Dominions of the then British Commonwealth, including the Irish Free State, to one another and the United Kingdom. Though a few constitutional links between the Dominions and the United Kingdom remained, this is often seen as the moment at which the Dominions became fully sovereign states.

De Valera, in his capacity as Prime Minister of His Majesty's Government in the Irish Free State, wrote in July 1936 to King Edward VIII in London indicating that he planned to introduce a new constitution, the central part of which was to be the creation of an office de Valera provisionally intended to call President of Saorstát Éireann, which would replace the Governor-General. De Valera used the sudden abdication of Edward VIII as King to pass two bills: one amended the constitution to remove all mention of the monarch and Governor-General, while the second brought the monarch back, this time through statute law, for use in representing the Irish Free State at a diplomatic level. With the implementation of the Constitution of Ireland, the title ultimately given to the president was President of Ireland.

The constitution contained reforms and symbols intended to assert Irish sovereignty. These included:
 a new name for the state, "Éire" (in Irish) and "Ireland" (in English);
 a claim that the national territory was the entire island of Ireland, thereby challenging Britain's partition settlement of 1921;
 the removal of references to the King of Ireland and the replacement of the monarch's representative, the governor-general, with a popularly elected President of Ireland, who takes "precedence over all other persons in the State and who shall exercise and perform the powers and functions conferred on the President by this Constitution and by law";
 recognition of the "special position" of the Catholic Church;
 a recognition of the Catholic concept of marriage which excluded civil divorce, even though civil marriage was retained;
 the declaration that the Irish language was the "national language" and the first official language of the nation although English was also included as "a" second official language;
 the use of Irish language terms to stress Irish cultural and historical identity (e.g., Uachtarán, Taoiseach, Tánaiste, etc.)

Criticisms of some of the above constitutional reforms include that:
 the anti-partition articles needlessly antagonised Unionists in Northern Ireland, while simultaneously attracting criticism from hardline republicans by recognising the  situation.
 similarly, the recognition of the "special position" of the Catholic Church was inconsistent with the identity and aspirations of northern Protestants (leading to its repeal in the 1970s), while simultaneously falling short of the demands of hardline Catholics for Catholicism to be explicitly made the state religion.
 the affirmation of Irish as the national and primary official language neither reflected contemporary realities nor led to the language's revival
 though the King was removed from the text of the constitution, he retained a leading role in the state's foreign affairs, and the legal position of the President of Ireland was accordingly uncertain; there was also concern that the presidency would evolve into a dictatorial position
 elements of Catholic social teaching incorporated into the text, such as the articles on the role of women, the family and divorce, were inconsistent both with the practice of the Protestant minority and with contemporary liberal opinion

As Paul Bew concludes, in the constitution of 1937 de Valera was "trying to placate left-wing Republicans with national phrases and pious people with expressly Catholic bits [and] patriarchal Catholicism".

The Constitution was approved in a plebiscite on 1 July 1937 and came into force on 29 December 1937.

The Emergency (World War II)

By September 1939, a general European war was imminent. On 2 September, de Valera advised Dáil Éireann that neutrality was the best policy for the country. This policy had overwhelming political and popular support, though some advocated Irish participation in the war on the Allied side, while others, believing that "England's difficulty is Ireland's opportunity", were pro-German. Strong objections to conscription in the North were voiced by de Valera. In June 1940, to encourage the neutral Irish state to join with the Allies, Winston Churchill indicated to de Valera that the United Kingdom would push for Irish unity, but believing that Churchill could not deliver, de Valera declined the offer. The day after the attacks on Pearl Harbor Churchill wired de Valera: "Now is your chance. Now or never! A nation once again. I will meet you wherever you wish." The British did not inform the Government of Northern Ireland that they had made the offer to the Irish government, and De Valera's rejection was not publicised until 1970. The government secured wide powers for the duration of the Emergency, such as internment, censorship of the press and correspondence, and the government control of the economy. The Emergency Powers Act lapsed on 2 September 1946, though the State of Emergency declared under the constitution was not lifted until the 1970s. This status remained throughout the war, despite pressure from Chamberlain and Churchill. However, de Valera did respond to a request from Northern Ireland for fire tenders to assist in fighting fires following the  1941 Belfast Blitz.

Persistent claims that de Valera sent a personal note of congratulation to Subhas Chandra Bose upon his declaration of the Azad Hind (Free India) government in 1943, have been shown to be inaccurate, and largely a misrepresentation by Japanese consular staff in Dublin of a statement by a small and unofficial Republican group unconnected to the Irish government.

Controversially, de Valera formally offered his condolences to the German ambassador in Dublin on the death of Adolf Hitler in 1945, in accordance with diplomatic protocol. This did some damage to Ireland, particularly in the United States – and soon afterwards de Valera had a bitter exchange of words with Churchill in two famous radio addresses after the end of the war in Europe. De Valera denounced reports of Bergen-Belsen concentration camp as "anti-national propaganda"; according to Bew, this was not out of disbelief but rather because the Holocaust undermined the main assumption underlying Irish neutrality: moral equivalence between the Allies and the Axis.

The de Valera government was reputedly harsh with Irish Army deserters who had enlisted to fight with the Allied armies against the Axis. The legislation in question was the Emergency Powers (No. 362) order which was passed in August 1945. On 18 October 1945, Thomas F. O'Higgins moved to annul the order. He did not condone desertion, but felt that the order was specifically harsh on those deserters who had served in the Allied forces. General Richard Mulcahy also spoke against the Order, disagreeing with the way in which it applied to enlisted men and not to officers. It was revoked with effect from 1 August 1946, but was in effect continued by section 13 of the Defence Forces (Temporary Provisions) Act, 1946.

Post-war period: Taoiseach/Opposition leader

Opposition leader (1948–1951)
After de Valera had spent sixteen years in power without answering the crucial questions of partition and republican status the public demanded a change from Fianna Fáil government. In the 1948 election, de Valera lost the outright majority he had enjoyed since 1933. It initially looked as if the National Labour Party would give Fianna Fáil enough support to stay in office as a minority government, but National Labour insisted on a formal coalition agreement, something de Valera was unwilling to concede. However, while Fianna Fáil was six seats short of a majority, it was still by far the largest party in the Dáil, with 37 more TDs than the next largest party and rival, Fine Gael (the successor to Cumann na nGaedheal). Conventional wisdom held that de Valera would remain Taoiseach with the support of independent deputies.

This belief came to nought when (after the final votes were counted) the other parties realised that if they banded together, they would have only one seat fewer than Fianna Fáil, and would be able to form a government with the support of at least seven independents. The result was the First Inter-Party Government, with John A. Costello of Fine Gael as its compromise candidate for Taoiseach. Costello was duly nominated, consigning de Valera to opposition for the first time in 16 years. The following year, Costello declared Ireland as a republic, leaving partition as the most pressing political issue of the day.

De Valera, now Leader of the Opposition, left the actual parliamentary practice of opposing the government to his deputy, Seán Lemass, and himself embarked on a world campaign to address the issue of partition. He visited the United States, Australia, New Zealand and India, and in the latter country, was the last guest of the Governor-General, Lord Mountbatten of Burma, before he was succeeded by the first Indian-born Governor-General. In Melbourne, Australia, de Valera was feted by the powerful Catholic Archbishop Daniel Mannix, at the centenary celebrations of the diocese of Melbourne. He attended mass-meetings at Xavier College, and addressed the assembled Melbourne Celtic Club. In Brisbane, Australia, at the request of the influential and long serving Archbishop Duhig de Valera laid the foundation stone for the new High School building at Marist Brothers College Rosalie. In October 1950, just thirty years after his dramatic escape from Lincoln Gaol, he returned to Lincoln and received the freedom of the gaol. The Anti-Partition of Ireland League of Great Britain marked the occasion with a dinner in his honour and the toast was 'Anglo-Irish Friendship'. A key message in de Valera's campaign was that Ireland could not join the recently established North Atlantic Treaty Organization as long as Northern Ireland was in British hands; although Costello's government favoured alliance with NATO, de Valera's approach won more widespread support and prevented the state from signing the treaty.

Final years as Taoiseach

Returning to Ireland during the Mother and Child Scheme crisis that racked the First Inter-Party Government, de Valera kept silent as Leader of the Opposition, preferring to stay aloof from the controversy. That stance helped return de Valera to power in the 1951 general election, but without an overall majority. His and Fianna Fáil's popularity was short-lived, however; his government introduced severe, deflationary budgetary and economic policies in 1952, causing a political backlash that cost Fianna Fáil several seats in the Dáil in by-elections of 1953 and early 1954. Faced with a likely loss of confidence in the Dáil, de Valera instead called an election in May 1954, in which Fianna Fáil was defeated and a Second Inter-Party Government was formed with John A. Costello again as Taoiseach.

On 16 September 1953, de Valera met British Prime Minister Winston Churchill for the first and only time, at 10 Downing Street. (The two men had seen each other at a party in 1949, but without speaking). He surprised the UK Prime Minister by claiming that if he had been in office in 1948 Ireland would not have left the Commonwealth.

It was during this period that de Valera's eyesight began to deteriorate and he was forced to spend several months in the Netherlands, where he had six operations. In 1955, while in opposition, de Valera spoke against the formation of a European Parliament and European federalism, noting that Ireland "did not strive to get out of that British domination [...] to get into a worse [position]".

Like the first coalition government, the second lasted only three years. At the general election of 1957, de Valera, then in his seventy-fifth year, won an absolute majority of nine seats, the greatest number he had ever secured. This was the beginning of another sixteen-year period in office for Fianna Fáil. A new economic policy emerged with the First Programme for Economic Expansion. In July 1957, in response to the Border Campaign (IRA), Part II of the Offences Against the State Act was re-activated and he ordered the internment without trial of Republican suspects, an action which did much to end the IRA's campaign.

De Valera's final term as Taoiseach also saw the passage of numerous reforms in health and welfare. In 1952, unemployment insurance was extended to male agricultural employees, child allowances were extended to the second child, and a maternity allowance for insured women was introduced. A year later, eligibility for maternity and child services and public hospital services was extended to approximately 85% of the population.

Presidency

While Fianna Fáil remained popular among the electorate, 75-year-old de Valera had begun to be seen by the electorate as too old and out of touch to remain as head of government. At the urging of party officials, de Valera decided to retire from government and the Dáil and instead seek the presidency of Ireland. He won the 1959 presidential election on 17 June 1959 and resigned as Taoiseach, Leader of Fianna Fáil and a TD for Clare, six days later, handing over power to Seán Lemass.

De Valera was inaugurated President of Ireland on 25 June 1959. He was re-elected President in 1966, aged 84. That would remain a world record for oldest elected head of state until 2013, At his retirement in 1973 at the age of 90, he was the oldest head of state in the world.

As President of Ireland, de Valera received many state visits, including the 1963 visit of US president John F. Kennedy. Five months later de Valera attended the state funeral for Kennedy in Washington, D.C. and accompanied a group of 24 Defence Forces cadets who performed a silent drill at his grave site. In June 1964, he returned to Washington, D.C. as the second President of Ireland to address the United States Congress.

In 1966, the Dublin Jewish community arranged the planting and dedication of the Éamon de Valera Forest in Israel, near Nazareth, in recognition of his support for Ireland's Jews.

In January 1969, de Valera became the first President to address both houses of the Oireachtas, to mark the fiftieth anniversary of the foundation of Dáil Éireann.

In 1969, seventy-three countries sent goodwill messages to NASA for the historic first lunar landing. These messages still rest on the lunar surface. De Valera's message on behalf of Ireland stated, "May God grant that the skill and courage which have enabled man to alight upon the Moon will enable him, also, to secure peace and happiness upon the Earth and avoid the danger of self-destruction."

Death

Éamon de Valera died from pneumonia and heart failure in Linden Convalescent Home, Blackrock, Dublin, on 29 August 1975, aged 92. His wife, Sinéad de Valera, four years his senior, had died the previous January, on the eve of their 65th wedding anniversary. His body lay in state at Dublin Castle and was given a full state funeral on 3 September at St Mary's Pro-Cathedral, which was broadcast on national television. Over 200,000 people reportedly lined the three-mile funeral route from Dublin city centre to Glasnevin Cemetery. He is buried in Glasnevin alongside his wife and son Brian.

Legacy

De Valera's political creed evolved from militant republicanism to social and cultural conservatism.

Ireland's dominant political personality for many decades, de Valera received numerous honours. He was elected Chancellor of the National University of Ireland in 1921, holding the post until his death. Pope John XXIII bestowed on him the Order of Christ (KSC). He received honorary degrees from universities in Ireland and abroad. In 1968, he was elected a Fellow of the Royal Society (FRS), a recognition of his lifelong interest in mathematics. He also served as a member of the Parliament of Northern Ireland (for Down from 1921 to 1929 and for South Down from 1933 to 1937), although he held to the republican policy of abstentionism and did not take his seat in Stormont.

De Valera was criticised for becoming co-owner of one of Ireland's most influential group of newspapers, Irish Press Newspapers, funded by numerous small investors who received no dividend for decades. De Valera is alleged by critics to have helped keep Ireland under the influence of Catholic conservatism. De Valera rejected, however, demands by organisations like Maria Duce that Roman Catholicism be made the state religion of Ireland, just as he rejected demands by the Irish Christian Front for the Irish Free State to support Francisco Franco during the Spanish Civil War.

De Valera's preoccupation with his part in history, and his need to explain and justify it, are reflected in innumerable ways. His faith in historians as trustworthy guardians of his reputation was not absolute. He made many attempts to influence their views and to adjust and refine the historical record whenever he felt this portrayed him, his allies or his cause inaccurately or unfavourably to his mind, these could often mean the same thing. He extended these endeavours to encompass the larger Irish public. An important function of his newspaper group, the Irish Press group, was to rectify what he saw as the errors and omissions of a decade in which he had been the subject of largely hostile commentary.

In recent decades, his role in Irish history has no longer been unequivocally seen by historians as a positive one, and a biography by Tim Pat Coogan alleges that his failures outweigh his achievements, with de Valera's reputation declining while that of his great rival in the 1920s, Michael Collins, was rising. A more recent 2007 work on de Valera by historian Diarmaid Ferriter presents a more positive picture of de Valera's legacy.
Bertie Ahern, at a book launch for Diarmaid Ferriter's biography of de Valera, described de Valera's achievements in political leadership during the formative years of the state:
One of de Valera's finest hours was his regrouping of the Republican side after defeat in the civil war, and setting his followers on an exclusively peaceful and democratic path, along which he later had to confront both domestic Fascism and the IRA. He became a democratic statesman, not a dictator. He did not purge the civil service of those who had served his predecessors, but made best use of the talent available.

A notable failure was his attempt to reverse the provision of the 1937 Constitution in relation to the electoral system. On retiring as Taoiseach in 1959, he proposed that the Proportional Representation system enshrined in that constitution should be replaced. De Valera argued that Proportional Representation had been responsible for the instability that had characterised much of the post war period. A constitutional referendum to ratify this was defeated by the people. One aspect of de Valera's legacy is that since the foundation of the state, a de Valera has nearly always served in Dáil Éireann. Éamon de Valera served until 1959, his son, Vivion de Valera, was also a Teachta Dála (TD). Éamon Ó Cuív, his grandson, is currently a member of the Dáil while his granddaughter, Síle de Valera is a former TD. Both have served in ministries in the Irish Government.

Catholic social policy

In 1931, de Valera said in the Dáil: "I believe that every citizen in this country is entitled to his share of public appointments, and that there should not be discrimination on the ground of religion, discrimination, mind you, in the sense that because a person was of a particular religion, religion should not be made an excuse for denying a person an appointment for which he or she was fully qualified. Then there comes the question, what are qualifications? If I thought that the principle that the librarian in a Catholic community should be Catholic was a new principle, introduced merely to deny a Protestant an appointment, I would vote against it, but I know from my youth that it is not so. ... if I had a vote on a local body, and if there were two qualified people who had to deal with a Catholic community, and if one was a Catholic and the other a Protestant, I would unhesitatingly vote for the Catholic. Let us be clear and let us know where we are."  Ryle Dwyer, writing in 2008, said "If those were his honest views, one could also say without hesitation that the Long Fellow was a bigot. But, in fact, he was just playing the role of a political hypocrite. It was cynical, but it should be stressed that he behaved responsibly in this regard when he came to power."

De Valera led Fianna Fáil to adopt conservative social policies, since he believed devoutly that the Catholic church and the family were central to Irish identity. He added clauses to the new Constitution of Ireland (1937) to "guard with special care the institution of marriage" and prohibit divorce. His constitution also recognised "the special position" of the Catholic Church and recognised other denominations including the Church of Ireland and Jewish congregations, while guaranteeing the religious freedom of all citizens; however, he resisted an attempt to make Roman Catholicism the state religion and his constitution forbids the establishment of a state religion. His policies were welcomed by a largely devout, conservative and rural electorate. The unenforceable articles in the constitution which reinforced the traditional view that a woman's place was in the home further illustrate the direction in which Ireland was moving. An act of 1935 prohibited the importation or sale of contraceptives. The most rigorous censorship laws in western Europe complete the picture.

The specific recognition of Roman Catholicism was deleted by the Fifth Amendment of the Constitution of Ireland (1973) and the prohibition of divorce was removed by the Fifteenth Amendment of the Constitution of Ireland (1996). Nevertheless, the Irish Supreme Court declared in 1973 that the 1935 contraception legislation was not repugnant to the Constitution and therefore remained valid. Subsequent laws have liberalised the use of contraception however, (see Contraception in the Republic of Ireland).

In popular culture
 De Valera's portrait illustrated the front cover of 25 March 1940 issue of TIME magazine accompanying the article EIRE: Prime Minister of Freedom.

De Valera has been portrayed by:
 Andre Van Gyseghem in a 1970 episode of ITV Playhouse entitled "Would You Look at Them Smashing all Those Lovely Windows?"
 Sonn Connaughton in a 1981 episode of The Life and Times of David Lloyd George entitled "Win or Lose"
 Barry McGovern in the 1991 TV movie The Treaty, which concerned the Anglo-Irish Treaty
 Arthur Riordan in the 1990s RTÉ television show Nighthawks
 Alan Rickman in the 1996 film Michael Collins, which depicted the events surrounding Ireland's struggle for independence from Britain
 Andrew Connolly in the 2001 TV mini-series Rebel Heart concerning the 1916 Rising
 Stephen Mullan in the 2016 TV mini-series Rebellion

Governments
The following governments were led by de Valera:
 2nd Ministry of the Irish Republic
 3rd Ministry of the Irish Republic
 6th Executive Council of the Irish Free State
 7th Executive Council of the Irish Free State
 8th Executive Council of the Irish Free State
 1st Government of Ireland
 2nd Government of Ireland
 3rd Government of Ireland
 4th Government of Ireland
 6th Government of Ireland
 8th Government of Ireland

See also
 List of members of the Oireachtas imprisoned during the Irish revolutionary period
 List of people on the postage stamps of Ireland
 Éamon de Valera Forest

Notes

References

Sources

Further reading
 
 
  published as Eamon de Valera: The Man Who Was Ireland (New York, 1993)
 
  excerpt and text search
 
 Fanning, Ronan. Éamon de Valera: A Will to Power (2016)
 
 
 
 
 
 
 
 
 
 
  – excerpt and text search

Historiography
 
 
 Girvin, Brian. "Beyond Revisionism? Some Recent Contributions to the Study of Modern Ireland." English Historical Review (2009) 124#506 :94–107· DOI: 10.1093/ehr/cen341
 Hogan, Gerard. "De Valera, the Constitution and the Historians." Irish Jurist 40 (2005).
 McCarthy, Mark. Ireland's 1916 Rising: Explorations of History-making, Commemoration & Heritage in Modern Times (Routledge, 2016).
 Murray, Patrick. "Obsessive historian: Eamon de Valera and the policing of his reputation." Proceedings of the Royal Irish Academy. Section C (2001): 37–65.

External links

 1911 Census return of Edward (sic) de Valera and household from the National Archives of Ireland
 Eamon de Valera's "India and Ireland" in the South Asian American Digital Archive (SAADA)
 Biography at Áras an Uachtaráin website
 Press Photographs of Eamon de Valera, taken from the Papers of Eamon de Valera held in UCD Archives. A UCD Digital Library Collection.
 De Valera Funeral – 1975, Movietone, 2 September 1975
 

 
1882 births
1975 deaths
De Valera family
People educated at C.B.S. Charleville
People educated at Rockwell College
People educated at Blackrock College
Alumni of the Royal University of Ireland
Valera, Eamon de
Fianna Fáil TDs
Heads of Irish provisional governments
Irish mathematicians
Irish nationalists
Irish prisoners of war
Leaders of Fianna Fáil
Leaders of Sinn Féin
Members of the 1st Dáil
Members of the 2nd Dáil
Members of the 3rd Dáil
Members of the 4th Dáil
Members of the 5th Dáil
Members of the 6th Dáil
Members of the 7th Dáil
Members of the 8th Dáil
Members of the 9th Dáil
Members of the 10th Dáil
Members of the 11th Dáil
Members of the 12th Dáil
Members of the 13th Dáil
Members of the 14th Dáil
Members of the 15th Dáil
Members of the 16th Dáil
Members of the Irish Republican Brotherhood
Members of the House of Commons of Northern Ireland 1921–1925
Members of the House of Commons of Northern Ireland 1925–1929
Members of the House of Commons of Northern Ireland 1933–1938
Members of the Parliament of the United Kingdom for County Clare constituencies (1801–1922)
Members of the Parliament of the United Kingdom for County Mayo constituencies (1801–1922)
Ministers for Education (Ireland)
Ministers for Foreign Affairs (Ireland)
Politicians from New York City
Politicians from County Limerick
People of the Easter Rising
People of the Irish Civil War (Anti-Treaty side)
People of the Irish War of Independence
Politicians imprisoned during the Irish revolutionary period
Presidents of Ireland
Presidents of the Executive Council of the Irish Free State
Prisoners sentenced to death by the United Kingdom
Taoisigh
The Irish Press people
UK MPs 1910–1918
UK MPs 1918–1922
World War II political leaders
Members of the House of Commons of Northern Ireland for County Down constituencies
Rugby union players from County Limerick
Munster Rugby players
Chancellors of the National University of Ireland
Deaths from pneumonia in the Republic of Ireland
Burials at Glasnevin Cemetery
Conservatism in Ireland
Faculty of Belvedere College
Escapees from England and Wales detention